The Weevac 6 is a brand of stretcher specifically created for the transport of babies, such as in hospitals or for patient evacuation. The Weevac 6 was invented by Canadian-born Wendy Murphy in 1985. She got the idea to make it while watching coverage of the Mexico City earthquake, wondering why there was not an evacuation device designed specifically for babies.

The origin of the name "Weevac 6" comes from the fact that the device is designed to transport "6 wee babies".

The Weevac 6 ranked at No. 35 on the CBC's miniseries The Greatest Canadian Invention.

References

External links 
 Weevac 6 website
 Weevac 6 on CBC's The Greatest Canadian Inventions

Beds
Medical transport devices